Lower Mangrove is a suburb of the Central Coast region of New South Wales, Australia, located about  upstream and north of Spencer along Mangrove Creek. It is part of the  local government area.

Suburbs of the Central Coast (New South Wales)